Masovians, also spelled as Mazovians, and historically known as Masurians, is an ethnographic group of Polish people that originate from the region of Masovia, located mostly within borders of the Masovian Voivodeship, Poland. They speak the Masovian dialect of Polish.

The group originate from the Lechitic tribe of Masovians, first referenced in the historical records by Nestor the Chronicler in the 11th century.

Name 
The name Masovian, in Polish, Mazowszanin, comes from the name of the region of Masovia, in Polish known as Mazowsze. The name of the region, comes from its Old Polish names Mazow, and Mazosze, and most likely came from word maz (ancestory word of modern maź and mazać), which was used to either describe a "muddy region" or a "person covered in mud".

Historically, prior to the World War II, the population was known as Masurians (Polish: Mazurzy). Currently, the name is exclusively associated with Masurians (historically known as Prussian Masurians), another ethnic group related to Masovians, who inhabit nearby region of Masuria, while the population of Masuria is exclusively related to as Masovians.

History 
The group originate from the Lechitic tribe of Masovians, first referenced in the historical records by Nestor the Chronicler in the 11th century. The tribe inhabited an area in modern region of Masovia, centered on the Vistula river. They were originally of the Slavic paganism faith, prior to the christianization of Poland, begun in 10th century. The main settlements of the tribes were Ciechanów, Czersk, Łomża, Płock, Płońsk, and Wizna.

Ethnographic subgroups 

There are several subgroups of Masovian people. It include Łowiczans, Kurpie, Masurians, Poborzans, and Podlachians. Historically, it also included  Międzyrzec Boyars.

Notes

References

Polish people
Ethnic groups in Poland
History of Masovia
Masovia
Masovian Voivodeship
West Slavic tribes
Lechites
Slavic ethnic groups